The SIAI-Marchetti SM.102 was a 1940s Italian light transport cabin monoplane designed and built by SIAI-Marchetti.

Development 
The SM.102 was developed from the abandoned SM.101 single-engined light transport monoplane. The SM.102 was a twin-engined low-wing cantilever monoplane with a tailwheel landing gear with retractable main gear. It had an enclosed cabin for two crew and eight passengers and the prototype was powered by two 500 hp (373 kW) Ranger SGV-770C-1B engines, one mounted on the leading edge of each wing. The prototype (registered I-NDIA) first flew on 24 February 1949 from Vergiate. The prototype was demonstrated in India and both the Middle and Far East without the success of any orders so it was decided to modify the design to meet a requirement for a light transport for the Italian Air Force. The new version was re-engined with two 450 hp (336 kW) Pratt & Whitney R-985 Wasp Junior radial engines and first flew on 7 April 1950. A small production run for the Italian Air Force followed.

Operators 

Italian Air Force  operated 21 SIAI-Marchetti SM.102 until 1959

Specifications

See also

References 

 

1940s Italian military transport aircraft
Savoia-Marchetti aircraft
Aircraft first flown in 1949
Low-wing aircraft
Twin piston-engined tractor aircraft